The nineteenth season of Family Guy aired on Fox from September 27, 2020, to May 16, 2021.

The series follows the dysfunctional Griffin family, consisting of father Peter, mother Lois, daughter Meg, son Chris, baby Stewie, and the family dog Brian, who reside in their hometown of Quahog.

Season nineteen premiered the run of the eighteenth production season, which was executive produced by Seth MacFarlane, Alec Sulkin, Richard Appel, Steve Callaghan, Danny Smith, Kara Vallow, Mark Hentemann, Tom Devanney and Patrick Meighan. Sulkin and Appel returned as the series' showrunners.

During this season, Stewie says his first word ("Stewie's First Word"), Peter becomes an Italian mob boss ("La Famiglia Guy"), Peter finds out his mortal enemy Ernie the Giant Chicken is dying ("Fecal Matters"), Quahog gets a new mayor, voiced by Sam Elliot ("Wild Wild West"), Meg adopts a cat ("Family Cat") and Brian and Stewie go on a Terminator-esque adventure to save Stewie's life. ("PeTerminator")

Production

Casting
On June 26, 2020, in the wake of the George Floyd riots, Mike Henry announced that he would no longer voice the African American character Cleveland Brown. Actor Wendell Pierce launched a campaign to become Mike Henry's replacement. It was later announced on September 25, 2020 that actor and YouTube personality Arif Zahir, who is known for voicing Cleveland in several fan videos, would be the new voice for the character. This makes Season 19 the final season in which Cleveland Brown is voiced by Mike Henry.

Release
The season premiered on September 27, 2020, airing on Sundays as part of Fox's Animation Domination programming block, along with The Simpsons, Bless the Harts, Bob's Burgers, and The Great North.

The season premiered on ITV2 in the UK on October 26, 2020.

The season is available to stream internationally in the UK, Australia and Canada on Disney+'s Star hub.

Episodes

Notes

References

2020 American television seasons
2021 American television seasons 
Family Guy seasons
Family Guy (season 19) episodes